The 2015 Advantage Cars Prague Open,  also known as Advantage Cars Prague Open by Zenova Services for sponsorship reasons, was a professional tennis tournament played on outdoor clay courts. It was the 22nd (ATP) and 11th (ITF) editions of the tournament and part of the 2015 ATP Challenger Tour and the 2015 ITF Women's Circuit, offering totals of €42,500 (ATP) and $75,000 (ITF) in prize money. It took place in Prague, Czech Republic, on 10–16 August 2015.

Men's singles main draw entrants

Seeds 

 1 Rankings as of 3 August 2015

Other entrants 
The following players received wildcards into the singles main draw:
  Jan Šátral
  Adrian Sikora
  Robin Staněk
  Dominik Šproch

The following players received entry from the qualifying draw:
  Rogério Dutra Silva
  Nikola Mektić
  Axel Michon
  Pere Riba

Women's singles main draw entrants

Seeds 

 1 Rankings as of 3 August 2015

Other entrants 
The following players received wildcards into the singles main draw:
  Petra Cetkovská
  Karolína Muchová
  Nicole Vaidišová
  Markéta Vondroušová

The following players received entry from the qualifying draw:
  Martina Borecká
  Georgina García Pérez
  Anastasiya Komardina
  Arantxa Rus

The following player received entry by a protected ranking:
  Victoria Kan

Champions

Men's singles

 Rogério Dutra Silva def.  Radu Albot, 6–2, 6–7(5–7), 6–4

Women's singles

 María Teresa Torró Flor def.  Denisa Allertová, 6–3, 7–6(7–5)

Men's doubles

 Wesley Koolhof /  Matwé Middelkoop def.  Sergey Betov /  Mikhail Elgin, 6–4, 3–6, [10–7]

Women's doubles

 Kateřina Kramperová /  Bernarda Pera def.  Miriam Kolodziejová /  Markéta Vondroušová, 7–6(7–4), 5–7, [10–1]

External links 
 2015 Advantage Cars Prague Open at ITFtennis.com
 Official website 

2015 ITF Women's Circuit
2015 ATP Challenger Tour
2015 in Czech tennis
2015